Taebaek station is a railway station in the city of Taebaek. It is on the Taebaek Line.

External links
 Cyber station information from Korail

Railway stations in Gangwon Province, South Korea
Taebaek
Railway stations opened in 1962